Sillerud is a parish in Årjäng Municipality, western Värmland, and partly in Dalsland, Sweden, with a population of approximately 110.

It is believed that Måns Andersson, an ancestor of the Bush family, was from Sillerud, because he named his farm in North America Silleryd. Place names with "-ryd" endings, however, are uncommon in Värmland but more common in South Sweden, particularly in Småland. Sill is the Swedish word for herring and rud/ryd means a small deforested area.

Populated places in Värmland County
Värmland